Sportverein Muttenz, is a football club from Muttenz, Switzerland, the club was founded in 1921, is currently playing in the Swiss 1. Liga.

Current squad

External links
 Official site

Football clubs in Switzerland
Association football clubs established in 1921
1921 establishments in Switzerland